The discography of Raven, an English heavy metal band, consists of twelve studio albums, three EPs, three live albums, five compilation albums and three singles.

Albums

Studio albums

Extended plays

Live albums

Compilation albums

Singles

References

Discographies of British artists